Jill Ann Weatherwax (October 26, 1970 – March 24, 1998) was an American model and aspiring singer. A former "Miss Hollywood", Weatherwax was found stabbed on March 25, 1998, in Fresno, California. Her murder remains unsolved.

Weatherwax's life and death was the subject of a 1999 episode of E! True Hollywood Story entitled "The Murder of Miss Hollywood".  She was interred in her hometown of Fenton, Michigan at Oakwood Cemetery. She is survived by her sister Julie Charlene Hickman who lives in Missouri .

References

1970 births
1998 deaths
Female models from Michigan
Deaths by stabbing in California
People murdered in California
American murder victims
People from Fenton, Michigan
March 1998 events in the United States
1998 in California
Fresno, California
20th-century American women
1998 murders in the United States
History of women in California